Pabradė (Podbrodz) is a town in Lithuania, in Švenčionys district municipality, on Žeimena river, 38 km south-west of Švenčionys.

Pabradė is a busy place as the Vilnius–Daugavpils railway is close to the city. It was quite a small settlement until the 19th century, when the Warsaw – Saint Petersburg Railway was built in 1862.

History
About 850 Jews lived in the town in 1939, comprising one third of the total population.
After June 1941, at the very beginning of the occupation, about a dozen Jews were executed. In the middle of July, Lithuanian policemen arrested about 60 Jews and shot them behind the mill. On September 1, the rest of the Jewish population was moved into a ghetto that was established on two streets, previously inhabited by Christians. The ghetto was open, so many of its residents escaped at the end of the month, after rumors about the forthcoming Aktion had spread. Over 100 Jews who were interred in the ghetto or who were recaptured were escorted to the military training camp in Švenčionėliai and shot on October 8–10, along with thousands of other Jews assembled there. Policemen continued searching for Jewish escapees, gathered them in groups and shot them on the outskirts of town.

Population
In 2011, the city's population was composed of Poles - 44.73% (2681), Lithuanians – 26.81% (1607), Russians - 18.45% (1106), Belarusians - 5.27% (316), Ukrainians - 1.17% (70), others - 3.57% (214).

Military base
Near the town, there is Pabradė Training Area, a major military facility of the Lithuanian Armed Forces, established in 1904. It has an area of 12,500 ha and can be used for training at a battalion level.

See also
 Gaižiūnai
 Rukla

References

External links
 Virtual Tour of Pabradė

Cities in Lithuania
Cities in Vilnius County
Wilno Voivodeship (1926–1939)
Holocaust locations in Lithuania